GNU SIP Witch is a free SIP server software with Peer-to-peer capabilities from the GNU Project.
It is the GNU implementation of the Session Initiation Protocol (SIP), which is being used for the routing of the calls.

Availability 
SIP Witch is released as free software under the terms of version 3 or later of the GNU General Public License (GPL). It is designed for Linux, macOS, BSD and Windows and planned support for Android. In the popular Linux distributions Ubuntu and Fedora it may be installed directly from the standard package sources.

Technology 
SIP Witch is written in the programming language C++ and uses the uCommon, eXosip and GNU oSIP libraries.

Features 
The software enables Voice over IP as part of a self-organising Peer-to-peer telephone network.
It supports features like call forwarding, call distribution, call hold, presence information and (text) messages, supports encrypted calls and also enables NAT traversal to establish the peer-to-peer connections.

History 
The SIP Witch is being developed since the 10th of August 2007 by David Sugar within the GNU Telephony project. The first version was 0.1.0. Version 1 was released on May 14, 2011. It is being used as a component of GNU Free Call, which is supposed to be an alternative to Skype.

See also

 List of SIP software – other SIP related programs
 FreeSWITCH

Sources

External links 
 official Website

Free VoIP software
SIP Witch